Nymphicula irianalis is a moth in the family Crambidae. It was described by David John Lawrence Agassiz in 2014. It is found in western New Guinea (Irian Jaya).

The wingspan is about 13 mm. The base of the forewings is brown with a pale yellow antemedian fascia. The central area of the costa is mixed pale yellow and pale fuscous and the median area is scaled with dark brown. The base of the hindwings is fuscous with a white subbasal fascia and a silver-grey tornal spot, as well as a yellow streak.

Etymology
The species name refers to the type locality in Irian Jaya.

References

Nymphicula
Moths described in 2014